Ikechukwu Nwamu  (born June 3, 1993) is an American-born Nigerian basketball player for SLUC Nancy of the LNB Pro A. Internationally he represents Nigeria, and he participated at the AfroBasket 2017.

College career
Nwamu spent one season at Cleveland State and two at Mercer. For his senior season, he transferred to UNLV. He averaged 11.4 points, 3.2 rebounds and 1.7 assists per game. Nwamu scored a career-high 38 points and grabbed a season-high eight rebounds on March 9, 2016, in a 108-102 triple overtime win over Air Force.

Professional career

Sioux Falls Skyforce (2016–2018)

2016–2017 seasons
After going undrafted in the 2016 NBA Draft, Nwamu was later selected by the Sioux Falls Skyforce in the first round (22nd overall) in the 2016 NBA Development League Draft. Nwamu was included in the training camp roster of the Sioux Falls Skyforce announced two days later. In 47 games for the Skyforce in 2016–2017, he averaged 9.1 points, 3.2 rebounds, 1 assist and 1 steal in 24.5 minutes per game.

2017–2018 seasons
On October 23, 2017, Nwamu was included in the training camp roster and later the opening day roster of the Sioux Falls Skyforce. In 47 games for the Skyforce in 2017–2018, he averaged 14.5 points, 3.2 rebounds, 2.3 assists and 1 steal in 29.5 minutes per game. He set a then Skyforce franchise record for most three pointers made in a season with 144 three point field goals.

Lavrio Megabolt (2018)
On April 10, 2018, the Lavrio Megabolt of the Greek Basket League (GBL) had announced their signing of Nwamu for the rest of the season.

2018–2019
In July 2018, Nwamu joined the Miami Heat for the 2018 NBA Summer League. On September 18, 2018, Nwamu signed a training camp deal with the Milwaukee Bucks. On September 20, 2018, Nwamu was waived by the Bucks. He was added to the opening night roster of the Wisconsin Herd on November 1, 2018.  On January 22, 2019, the Fort Wayne Mad Ants announced that they had acquired Nwamu and Jordan Barnett from the Wisconsin Herd for Elijah Stewart and the returning player rights to Alex Hamilton.

Fort Wayne Mad Ants (2019–2020)
Nwamu returned to the Mad Ants for the 2019–2020 season. In 19 games with the Mad Ants, Nwamu averaged 11.4 points, 3.3 rebounds, 1.7 assists and 0.7 steals in 23.6 minutes per game.

Northern Arizona Suns (2020)
On January 9, 2020, he was traded to the Northern Arizona Suns in exchange for Daxter Miles Jr.  Nwamu had nine 20+ point games in his 20 games with the Suns. With all nine coming off the bench, he surpassed Josh Gray (five, 2016–17) for the most 20+ point games off the bench in a single-season in team history. He has also tied the most career 20+ point games off the bench in team history. Nwamu averaged 17.7 points, 3.2 rebounds, 1.5 assists and 0.8 steals in 27.1 minutes per game.

Cholet Basket (2020)
On June 10, 2020, he signed with Cholet of the LNB Pro A. Nwamu and Cholet parted ways during the preseason.

BC Samara (2021)
On March 10, 2021, he signed with Samara of the Russian Basketball Super League 1. On May 4, 2021, Nwamu lead BC Samara to the Russian Super League 1 Championship after scoring 21 points. In 14 games he led the league in scoring averaging 19.6 points, 2.9 rebounds, 1.9 assists and 1.1 steals in 28.7 minutes per game. Nwamu was named the Import Player of the Year, All-Russian Super League 1 1st Team 2021, and Most Spectacular Player of the Russian Super League 1 despite only playing 14 games.

Ironi Ness Ziona (2021)
On August 18, 2021, he has signed with Ironi Ness Ziona of the Israeli Basketball Super League (IBSL).

References

External links
UNLV Runnin' Rebels bio 

1993 births
Living people
American expatriate basketball people in Greece
American men's basketball players
American people of Igbo descent
American sportspeople of Nigerian descent
Basketball players at the 2020 Summer Olympics
Basketball players from Los Angeles
Basketball players from Greensboro, North Carolina
Cleveland State Vikings men's basketball players
Fort Wayne Mad Ants players
Ironi Nes Ziona B.C. players
Mercer Bears men's basketball players
Nigerian expatriate sportspeople in Greece
Nigerian men's basketball players
Olympic basketball players of Nigeria
Point guards
Shooting guards
Sioux Falls Skyforce players
UNLV Runnin' Rebels basketball players
Wisconsin Herd players